Galactic core  or galaxy core can refer to:

Astronomy
Galactic Center of the Milky Way
Nucleus region of a galaxy
Active galactic nucleus, of a regular galaxy
Bulge (astronomy), the core of spiral galaxies in general
Central massive object, the mass concentration at the center of a galaxy
Supermassive black hole, the core of most galaxies

Smartphones
Samsung Galaxy Core 
Samsung Galaxy Core Advance
Samsung Galaxy Core LTE

Other
A computer video game developed by Spiderweb Software.

See also
Galactic Center (disambiguation)